Sadish Pathiranage (born 24 March 1997) is a Sri Lankan cricketer. He made his first-class debut for Tamil Union Cricket and Athletic Club in the 2018–19 Premier League Tournament on 7 December 2018. He made his Twenty20 debut for Tamil Union Cricket and Athletic Club in the 2018–19 SLC Twenty20 Tournament on 23 February 2019. He made his List A debut on 14 December 2019, for Tamil Union Cricket and Athletic Club in the 2019–20 Invitation Limited Over Tournament.

References

External links
 

1997 births
Living people
Sri Lankan cricketers
Tamil Union Cricket and Athletic Club cricketers
Place of birth missing (living people)